Scopula subpunctaria  is a moth of the  family Geometridae. It is found from northern and north-eastern China to the southern Palearctic realm (including southern and central Europe).

References

External links
Lepiforum.de
Scopula subpunctaria in France (INPN)

Moths described in 1847
subpunctaria
Moths of Asia
Moths of Europe
Taxa named by Gottlieb August Wilhelm Herrich-Schäffer